Abbey Gate may refer to the following places:

 Abbey Gate, Devon, a village near Axminster in Devon, England
 Abbey Gate, Kent, a village near Sandling in Kent, England
 Abbey Gate (Sorø), a gate of Sorø Abbey in Sorø, Denmark
 Abbeygate Shopping Centre, Nuneaton, Warwickshire, England
 Abbey Gate, one of the gates of Kabul International Airport in Kabul, Afghanistan

See also 
 Abbey Gate College, in Cheshire county (England)
 Abbey Gateway (disambiguation)